Trail Street is a 1947 American Western film directed by Ray Enright and starring Randolph Scott, Robert Ryan, Anne Jeffreys and George "Gabby" Hayes. Based on the novel Golden Horizons by William Corcoran, and a screenplay by Norman Houston and Gene Lewis, the film is about the legendary Bat Masterson who brings law and order to the town of Liberal, Kansas, and defends the local farmers against a murderous cattle baron. Filmed on location in Agoura, California, at the  Andy Jauregui Ranch in Newhall, California, and at the Encino Ranch of RKO Pictures. The film made a profit of $365,000.

Plot
The town of Liberal in southwestern Kansas needs the help of a lawman; so does the law-abiding land agent Allen Harper. Eager to help, stable keeper Billy Burns sends for his longtime friend, the legendary Bat Masterson.

Allen's sweetheart, Susan Pritchard, is pursued by Logan Maury, a corrupt cattle baron. Hired gun Lance Larkin, who works for Maury, beats up a farmer and has a fist fight with Harper until Bat arrives and throws Larkin in jail. Bat is appointed the town's marshal and appoints Billy as his deputy.

Ruby Stone, a saloon singer in love with Maury, tries to keep him away from good girl Susan. When a farmer is murdered, Allen is framed and faces a lynch mob. Ruby ends up betraying Maury who shoots her in the back. Maury's own men are offended by the death of Ruby and block his escape. Bat fires, killing Maury. Allen can now marry Susan, while the town makes Billy the new marshal as Bat rides away to become a journalist back East.

Cast
 Randolph Scott as Bat Masterson
 Robert Ryan as Allen Harper
 Anne Jeffreys as Ruby Stone
 George "Gabby" Hayes as Billy Jones
 Madge Meredith as Susan Pritchett
 Steve Brodie as Logan Maury
 Billy House as Carmody
 Virginia Sale as Hannah 
 Harry Woods as Lance Larkin
 Phil Warren as Slim
 Harry Harvey as Mayor 
 Jason Robards, Sr. as Jason (as Jason Robards)

Production
The screenplay for Trail Street was written by Norman Houston and Gene Lewis, based on a novel by William Corcoran that was published as a serial in Cosmopolitan under the title Trail Street. According to a news item in the Hollywood Reporter, Barbara Hale and Lawrence Tierney were originally cast in the leading roles.

According to the August 1946 edition of Hollywood Reporter, five hundred extras were hired for the fight scene between the farmers and the trail riders.

Reception
In his 1947 review for The New York Times, Bosley Crowther wrote that Trail Street was just another in a long line of Western about frontier marshal Bat Masterson, "no better nor worse than most of the rest". Crowther continued: 

In his review, Mike Grost wrote that although the film was no masterpiece, Trail Street contains "fresh visual thinking" and shows "graceful mise-en-scène". Grost continued:

See also
 Bat Masterson

References

External links
 
 
 
 

1947 films
1947 Western (genre) films
American Western (genre) films
RKO Pictures films
Films based on American novels
Films based on Western (genre) novels
Films directed by Ray Enright
Cultural depictions of Bat Masterson
American black-and-white films
Films scored by Paul Sawtell
1940s English-language films
1940s American films